Penal–Debe region is a region of Trinidad.  The local government body is Penal–Debe Regional Corporation, a Regional Corporation of Trinidad and Tobago. The region has a land area of 246.91 km². Urban areas within Penal–Debe include Penal, where the corporation is headquartered, and Debe. Indians make up the majority of the region with 71%, followed by minorities of Africans, Douglas, other multiracial, Europeans, Chinese, Amerindians, Portuguese, Arabs, and others. Hinduism is the largest religion in the region at 43%, followed by Christianity, Islam, not stated, others, Irreligion, Orisha-Shango, and Rastafari.

References

External links 
 

Regions of Trinidad and Tobago
Trinidad (island)